RAF Spadeadam (pronounced "Spade Adam")  is a Royal Air Force (RAF) station in Cumbria, England, close to the border with Northumberland. It is the home of the 9,000 acre (36 km2) electronic warfare (EW) tactics range, making it the largest (by area) RAF base in the United Kingdom. Its primary use is for EW training to the RAF and NATO allies. The site and course of Hadrian's Wall runs a few miles south of the range.

Spadeadam
The Spadeadam area was remote and largely uninhabited and known as Spadeadam Waste. It is mentioned as "Speir Adam" or "Spear Edom" in "Hobie Noble".

History

Cold War

The site was first built in 1955 to be the test centre for the Blue Streak intermediate-range ballistic missile project. The role of Spadeadam in Britain's Cold War nuclear weapons programme was made public in 2004 when tree felling uncovered remains of abandoned excavations for a missile silo. Spadeadam was probably intended to be one of 60 launch sites planned for remote locations.

The Rocket Establishment, as it was called, was divided into five areas: an administration and assembly block, a British Oxygen Company compound for on-site liquid oxygen fuel manufacture, a component test area, the engine test area and the static firing stands. The engine test area at Prior Lancy Rigg consisted of four concrete stands into which the engines could be mounted for test firing. Two rocket-firing stands themselves stood at Greymare Hills and were large enough to accommodate a full Blue Streak missile.

The RAF took the site over in 1976 and it became Europe's first electronic warfare tactics range in 1977.

Post-Cold War
The site continues to be used in training the Royal Air Force and NATO allied aircrew in electronic warfare. It also hosts other exercising forces such as JFACTSU forward air controller training delivered from RAF Leeming in North Yorkshire. Close air support (CAS) training is carried out too. Since 2006, this has been the only mainland UK location where aircrews can drop practice bombs.

DNV GL (previously Advantica) uses the site for industrial hazard testing including fire and the destruction of pipelines. The remoteness of the area is key to their operations.

In July 2021, RAF Spadeadam was used to conduct drone swarm trials; a first for the British Armed Forces.

Landscape
The outlying moorland landscape of the site is of increasing importance for its visual quality and for nature conservation.  The area includes a pristine peat bog, populations of all three species of British newt and forestry habitat suitable for endangered red squirrels. Otters have been noted along the watercourses and still ponds that are dotted across the vast training area. Trees that were planted on the site after the First World War were felled in 2008 to 2009 to allow the peat bogs to return. Despite concerns about trees being carbon sinks, the rarity of the peat habitat meant the Forestry Commission decided to fell 145,000 trees.

Freedoms
RAF Spadeadam has received the Freedom of several locations throughout its history; these include:
  18 June 2017: Brampton.
  2 June 2018: Carlisle.

References

External links

Photos from a Subterranea Britannica visit
RAF Spadeadam on Multimap.com Priorlancy rocket engine test area Rocket & missile test area at Graymare Hill

GL Noble Denton - Spadeadam Test Site
Google Earth view of Spadeadam Farm

Bombing ranges
City of Carlisle
Spadeadam
Science and technology in Cumbria
Space programme of the United Kingdom